Lamer is a surname. Notable people with the surname include:

Thomas Lamer (died 1397/1398), English politician
Antonio Lamer (1933–2007), Canadian lawyer

See also
Hamer (surname)
Ine Lamers (born 1954), Dutch photographer and video installation artist